Loop 323 is a state highway loop in Texas in the United States. It is a  highway circling the city of Tyler in Smith County.

History
On November 20, 1951, Farm to Market Road 1803 (FM 1803) was established as a  bypass from US 271 northeast of Tyler, to SH 64 east of Tyler. On October 29, 1953, FM 845, was created as another bypass around the north side of Tyler, covering  from SH 31 to US 271 and the northern end of FM 1803. On December 3, 1954, FM 845 was merged into FM 1803, so that the route, once completely constructed, would have a single highway designation.

On October 30, 1957, with its southern portion now under construction, FM 1803 was redesignated as Loop 323. The southern portion was to be designated as Loop 323 upon completion, while the northern portion — the original segments of the old FM 845 and FM 1803 — were resigned to coincide with the release of the 1958 official state highway map.  Since the 1957 redesignation, no further routing changes to Loop 323 have been made.

Route description
The northern terminus of Loop 323 is at US 271 and SH 155 northeast of Tyler. From there, Loop 323 travels south, intersecting its own "southern" terminus after . Continuing south, it intersects SH 31, Loop 124 and SH 64 on the east side of Tyler; then, traveling southwest, it crosses SH 110. Shifting to a westward direction, it crosses US 69 and FM 2493 south of town, and SH 155 southwest of Tyler. Now heading north, it intersects with Spur 364 and crosses SH 31, SH 64, and SH 110 for the second time each, before turning northeast and intersecting US 69 again.

Junction list

See also
Texas State Highway Loop 49

References

323
Transportation in Smith County, Texas
Tyler, Texas